SS Admiral Halstead was a merchant ship built in 1920 by the Submarine Boat Corporation, Newark, New Jersey, and operating originally as Suwordenco.  The ship's history illustrates the state of the industry as the massive World War I shipbuilding program transitioned to an effort to sell and operate hulls in a market glutted by wartime shipbuilding. By the outbreak of World War II Suwordenco was one of the few ships operating as its owners went bankrupt. The ship was bought for operation from the Puget Sound to California ports until it was caught up in the prelude to the United States' entry into the war.

The ship played a role in the effort to support the Philippines, finding itself in the Pensacola Convoy that was diverted to Australia. The convoy reached Brisbane on 22 December 1941 with Admiral Halstead being placed under U.S. Army charter that day to be operated by its company, the Pacific Lighterage Company. The convoy provided the base for the United States Army buildup in Australia. Admiral Halstead was sent to northern Australia arriving at Darwin to be present when the port was bombed on 19 February 1942. Admiral Halstead was damaged and the crew abandoned but returned and over the next five days, working at night and moving to an anchorage by day, unloaded some 8,000 drums of the cargo of aviation gasoline.

Construction
Submarine Boat Corporation, Newark, New Jersey, had operated the Newark yard to build Emergency Fleet Corporation (EFC) Design 1023 ships designed by Theodore E. Ferris for the United States Shipping Board (USSB) with thirty-two hulls cancelled as the war ended. After the war the USSB agreed to sell the yard to the operator after paying rent for three years and selling steel on hand at half the original cost. Those thirty-two ships were then completed on Submarine Boat's own account. Suwordenco, yard number 142, was launched on 22 October 1920 and completed in November 1920. The name was a construct given to all thirty-two ships. It was formed by a standard prefix "Su" and suffix "co" from Submarine Boat Corporation with an intervening "word" based on a person, place or company. Suwordenco was named for company general manager B. L. Worden. The ship, assigned official number 220862 and call letters MCBK, was registered in New York, New York operated by Submarine Boat's shipping subsidiary, Transmarine.

Ship's power for propulsion and auxiliaries was steam from two Babcock & Wilcox oil fired water tube boilers.

Submarine Boat went into receivership in 1930 with its Transmarine operating subsidiary ceasing operations. Suwordenco, the last operating ship, arrived in the port of San Pedro, California on 13 January 1930 with an uncertain future. Suwordenco was sold later in 1930 to operate with the Admiral Line of the Pacific Steamship Company and renamed Admiral Halstead. After renovation by the Moore Dry Dock Company, Oakland, California, the ship was put on the Puget Sound — California route. In 1936 the ship was sold to Pacific Lighterage.

The company's main routes were from Alaska to California but it had some service into the Pacific to the Philippines.

World War II
Pacific Lighterage's Admiral Halstead entered the war as part of the Pensacola Convoy that departed Honolulu on the way to the Philippines. The ship's cargo was approximately 3,000 drums of aviation gasoline. The convoy, avoiding the Japanese Mandate island areas with a route southwest, had crossed the Equator on 6 December and received the news of war the morning of 7 December 1941. The convoy arrived at Brisbane on 22 December. On arrival Admiral Halstead was placed under U.S. Army charter with Pacific Lighterage as operator. The ship became part of the Southwest Pacific Area (SWPA) Australian based permanent local fleet on 31 December 1941 assigned the local identification number X-3.

The ship arrived in Darwin on 18 February 1942 loaded with 14,000 drums of aviation gasoline destined for the Philippines. On 19 February 1942 Japanese aircraft attacked the port, surrounding installations, and other ships in the port and area. Admiral Halstead was strafed and near bomb misses sprung plates causing some flooding. The crew abandoned ship but returned to bring the ship in to unload the critical aviation gasoline cargo over a number of nights and going offshore to during the day. The crew of the heavily damaged and beached  was drafted to unload the cargo. At one point, after objecting that the troops and Australian stevedores were idle and not so engaged, they were held under arrest.

Admiral Halstead remained with the SWPA permanent local fleet until August 1945.

Post war
Admiral Halstead was delivered for commercial operation to Pacific Lighterage at San Francisco on 2 March 1946. The company became Pacific Mail Steamship Company in 1947 with the ship operating with that line until broken up in 1949.

See also
   sister ship
 SS Coast Farmer   sister ship
 SS Coast Trader  sister ship

Footnotes

References

Bibliography

1920 ships
Merchant ships of the United States
Ships built by the Submarine Boat Company
Design 1023 ships